Fabrice Tiozzo (born May 8, 1969) is a French former professional boxer who competed from 1988 to 2006. He is a world champion in two weight classes, having held the WBC light-heavyweight title from 1995 to 1997, the WBA cruiserweight title from 1997 to 2000, and the WBA light-heavyweight title from 2004 to 2006. He is the younger brother of former super middleweight world champion of boxing, Christophe Tiozzo.

Professional career

Fabrice turned professional in 1988 & amassed a record of 25-0 before he unsuccessfully fought American boxer Virgil Hill, for the WBA light heavyweight world title. Fabrice would get another opportunity at a world title nearly two years later, this time facing & defeating Jamaican boxer Mike McCallum, to win the WBC world title.

Personal life
Fabrice has two brothers Christophe & Franck, who are also professional boxers.

Professional boxing record

See also
Notable boxing families
List of world light-heavyweight boxing champions
List of world cruiserweight boxing champions

References

External links

 

|}

1969 births
Living people
French male boxers
French people of Italian descent
Sportspeople from Saint-Denis, Seine-Saint-Denis
World light-heavyweight boxing champions
World cruiserweight boxing champions
European Boxing Union champions
World Boxing Council champions
World Boxing Association champions